Windstream Kentucky East LLC is a Windstream operating company providing local telephone services to portions of Kentucky.

History
Windstream Kentucky East was established in 2001 as Kentucky ALLTEL, Inc. (as opposed to ALLTEL Kentucky, Inc., an existing company Alltel owned). The company was founded to take over Verizon South operations that were formerly operated by GTE and included were those originally operated by Contel. In 2002, the sale of Verizon's assets in Kentucky took place, with Alltel becoming owner.

In 2006, the company was renamed Windstream Kentucky East, Inc., following the sale of Alltel's wireline assets to Valor Telecom. Valor renamed itself Windstream.

In 2007, the company became a limited liability company.

As of 2012, the company has 676 employees and operates 508,000 lines in 94 exchanges.

References

American companies established in 2001
Telecommunications companies established in 2001
2001 establishments in Kentucky
Companies established in 2001
Communications in Kentucky
Windstream Communications
Verizon Communications
Telecommunications companies of the United States